Courcelles-lès-Lens (literally Courcelles near Lens) is a commune in the Pas-de-Calais department in the Hauts-de-France region of France.

Geography
The canalized river Deûle forms the north-eastern border of the commune.

Population

Places of interest
 The church of St.Vaast, rebuilt, as was much of the town, after the First World War.
 "La gare d'eau", built in the early 20th century, it could host more than 200 riverboats.
 The "Saint-Brayou" stone.
 A memorial dedicated to the coal-workers who died during the town's mining disasters.
 The town's old windmill which was renovated during the 00's.

Notable residents
 
 Adulphe Delegorgue (1814-1850)
He was a hunter and naturalist born in Courcelles-lès-Lens 13 November 1814. He was the son of Adulphe Delegorgue, farmer and former mayor of Courcelles-lès-Lens. He became a sailor at the age of 16. He started his first expedition in Africa at the age of 23, and took part in the improvement of Paris' and Douai's Natural History Museum collection.
He died of disease during his fourth expedition. He wrote "Voyage dans l'Afrique Australe" published in 1847 and gave his name to several animal species.
The secondary school of Courcelles-lès-lens is named after him.

See also
Communes of the Pas-de-Calais department

References

External links

 Website about the town 

Courcellesleslens
Artois